Miroslav Kirchev (born 12 June 1990) is a Bulgarian sprint canoeist. At the 2012 Summer Olympics, he competed in the Men's K-1 1000 metres, finishing in 11th place.  He competed in the same event at the 2016 Olympics, finishing in 19th place.

References

External links
 
 
 

Bulgarian male canoeists
1990 births
Living people
Olympic canoeists of Bulgaria
Canoeists at the 2012 Summer Olympics
Canoeists at the 2016 Summer Olympics
Canoeists at the 2015 European Games
European Games competitors for Bulgaria
Canoeists at the 2019 European Games

Sportspeople from Ruse, Bulgaria